Gabriello Ferrantini, also known as Gabriel degli Occhiali, was an Italian painter of the Baroque period, active mainly in Bologna in the late 16th and early 17th century. He was a pupil of the painter Denis Calvaert and Francesco Gessi. Among his pupils were Matteo Borboni and Michelangelo Colonna. Ferrantini was primarily known for painted sacred figures using the Fresco technique.

References

16th-century Italian painters
Italian male painters
17th-century Italian painters
Painters from Bologna
Fresco painters
Italian Baroque painters
Year of death unknown
Year of birth unknown